The Quentaris Chronicles is a shared universe series of fantasy books initially published by Lothian Books, but now published by Ford Street Press. The books in the series are written by various Australian authors including Isobelle Carmody, Pamela Freeman and John Heffernan. Though they are written by different authors and usually star new characters, they are all set in the magical city of Quentaris. There are also several recurring characters that play minor roles e.g. Stanas the water magician. The series editors are Paul Collins and Michael Pryor.

List of books

References

External links 
 
 
 Michael Pryor at Penguin Books Australia (formerly House of Legends)
 Paul Collins: Author, Editor, Publisher, Events Coordinator Paul Collins's website
 Ford St Publishing Publisher of the second series: Quentaris: Quest of the Lost City

Australian fantasy novels
Australian fantasy novel series
Fantasy novel series
Lothian Books books